Battle of Cepeda may refer to:

Battle of Cepeda (1820), first major battle between Federals and Unitarians in Argentina
Battle of Cepeda (1859), in which Argentine Federals defeated the Unitarians